Anđelko Marušić (1 January 1911 – 5 October 1981) was a Yugoslav professional footballer. He spent his senior career with Hajduk Split, also making 16 appearances for the Yugoslavian national football team.

Honours

Player
Hajduk Split 
 Banovina of Croatia: 1940–41

References 

Yugoslav footballers
1911 births
1981 deaths
Yugoslavia international footballers
Association football midfielders